Békés is an administrative division (county or vármegye) in south-eastern Hungary, on the border with Romania. It shares borders with the Hungarian counties Csongrád, Jász-Nagykun-Szolnok, and Hajdú-Bihar. The capital of Békés county is Békéscsaba. The county is also part of the Danube-Kris-Mures-Tisa euroregion.

Etymology
In Slovak, it is known as Békešská župa and in Romanian as Județul Bichiș.

After Hungarians conquered the area, Békés and its surroundings were the property of the Csolt clan. Békés (the name means "peaceful") was originally the name of the castle which gave its name to the comitatus, and, like many castles, was possibly named after its first steward.

Geography
This county has a total area of  – 6.05% of Hungary.

Békés County lies on the Pannonian Plain (Great Plain) and is a flat area with good soil. The average rainfall is 645 mm per year. One-fifth of the natural gas resources of Hungary can be found in Békés. The river Körös runs through the county.

Neighbours
 Hajdú-Bihar County on the north.
  on the east and south – Counties of Arad and Bihor.
 Csongrád-Csanád and Jász-Nagykun-Szolnok County on the west.

History

The area has been inhabited since 5000-4000 BC. Before the arrival of the Hungarians several other tribes lived in the area.

The castle of Gyula was built in the early 15th century. Gyula was the most significant town of the county at that time, and became the county seat under Matthias I. It was an important fortress during the Ottoman wars in Europe but it was captured in 1566. During this time, several towns were destroyed in the area.

In the early 18th century, after the Ottomans were expelled, the county was repopulated, not only with Hungarians, but with Slovaks (in the towns Békéscsaba, Endrőd, Szarvas, Tótkomlós), Serbs (Battonya), Germans (Németgyula, Elek), and Romanians (Kétegyháza). Most of the non-Magyar population was assimilated by the mid-19th century.

The agricultural importance of the county and the new railway line between Pest and Békéscsaba (finished in 1858) brought development, which was quickened when Hungary lost its southern territories to Romania after World War I and Békéscsaba had to take over the role of the lost cities.

The population growth peaked in 1950 (472,000), in the same year when Békéscsaba became the county seat. During the following years, the county was industrialized, like most of Hungary, and the population of the cities and towns grew.

Demographics

In 2015, it had a population of 351,148 and the population density was 62/km2.
More than 60% of the population lives in towns.

Ethnicity
Besides the Hungarian majority, the main minorities are the Roma (approx. 9,500), Slovak (7,500), Romanian (5,000), German (2,500) and Serb (500).

Total population (2011 census): 359,948
Ethnic groups (2011 census):
Identified themselves: 325,597 persons:
Hungarians: 300,213 (92.20%)
Gypsies: 9,290 (2.85%)
Slovaks: 7,267 (2.23%)
Romanians: 5,137 (1.58%)
Others and indefinable: 3,690 (1.13%)
Approx. 53,000 persons in Békés County did not declare their ethnic group at the 2011 census.

Religion

Religious adherence in the county according to 2011 census:

Catholic – 70,307 (Roman Catholic – 69,478; Greek Catholic – 809);
Reformed – 46,366;
Evangelical – 27,870; 
Orthodox – 3,491;
Other religions – 6,936; 
Non-religious – 113,094; 
Atheism – 4,150;
Undeclared – 87,734.

Regional structure

Politics

County Assembly

The Békés County Council, elected at the 2019 local government elections, is made up of 17 councillors, with the following party composition:

Presidents of the County Assembly

Members of the National Assembly
The following members elected of the National Assembly during the 2022 parliamentary election:

Municipalities

Békés County has 1 urban county, 21 towns, 8 large villages and 45 villages.

The regional structure of Békés county is typical of the Great Plain: it has a small number of villages, but those are large, both by area and by population. There are several farmsteads as well. 70% of the population lives in cities and towns, while 17% are in the county seat. A large village network is characteristic of the county which currently has 75 administratively independent settlements, of which 19 are cities and 56 are villages. The oldest towns, and with the largest populations, are: Békéscsaba, the county seat - a city carrying a rank of county right, Orosháza, Gyula, Békés, and Szarvas.

City with county rights
(ordered by population, as of 2011 census)
Békéscsaba (62,050) – county seat

Towns

Gyula (31,067)
Orosháza (29,081)
Békés (20,088)
Szarvas (16,956)
Gyomaendrőd (13,680)
Mezőberény (10,632)
Sarkad (10,020)
Szeghalom (9,290)
Dévaványa (7,899)
Vésztő (6,986)
Mezőkovácsháza (6,177)
Battonya (6,042)
Tótkomlós (6,016)
Füzesgyarmat (5,734)
Mezőhegyes (5,712)
Kondoros (5,228)
Újkígyós (5,196)
Csorvás (5,060)
Elek (4,927)
Körösladány (4,674)
Medgyesegyháza (3,698)

Villages

Almáskamarás
Békéssámson
Békésszentandrás 
Bélmegyer
Biharugra
Bucsa
Csabacsűd 
Csabaszabadi
Csanádapáca
Csárdaszállás
Doboz 
Dombegyház 
Dombiratos
Ecsegfalva
Gádoros 
Gerendás
Geszt
Hunya
Kamut
Kardos
Kardoskút
Kaszaper
Kertészsziget
Kevermes 
Kétegyháza 
Kétsoprony
Kisdombegyház
Körösnagyharsány
Köröstarcsa
Körösújfalu
Kötegyán
Kunágota
Lőkösháza
Magyarbánhegyes
Magyardombegyház
Medgyesbodzás
Mezőgyán
Méhkerék
Murony
Nagybánhegyes
Nagykamarás
Nagyszénás 
Okány
Örménykút
Pusztaföldvár
Pusztaottlaka
Sarkadkeresztúr
Szabadkígyós
Tarhos
Telekgerendás
Újszalonta
Végegyháza
Zsadány

 municipalities are large villages.

Gallery

Notable people
Natives of the county include:

International relations
Békés County has a partnership relationship with:

References

External links
 Official site in Hungarian, German, English, Slovak and Romanian
 Békés Megyei Hírlap (beol.hu) - The county portal
Hungary at GeoHive
Roaming in Békés County free guide 2010 Published by Békés County Government Text by Barát Tünde

 
Counties of Hungary